The LORAN-C transmitter Havre was the master station of the North-Central U.S. LORAN-C Chain (GRI 8290), situated at Havre, Montana at .

The station was closed on February 8, 2010, as a budget cut.  The station, and all of the others, were considered to be obsolete with the general availability of GPS systems.

External links
 http://www.tech-service.net/loran/LORAN-1.XLS
 http://www.megapulse.com/chaininfo.html

Havre
Towers in Montana
2010 disestablishments in Montana